Choco Orta (born Virgen Milagros Orta Rodriguez on November 28, 1959) is a Latin, Tropical and Salsa singer, percussionist, dancer and actress, born in Santurce, Puerto Rico.

References

External links

 Music of Puerto Rico - Profile as singer.
[ All Music profile]
Latin Beat magazine article (November 2002) - Article discusses Choco Orta
Profile at SalsaArtists.com

1959 births
Living people
People from San Juan, Puerto Rico
20th-century Puerto Rican actresses
20th-century Puerto Rican women singers
Salsa musicians